The String Quartet No. 2 is the second string quartet by the American composer Christopher Rouse.  The work was commissioned by the Cleveland Quartet with additional contributions from the Eastman School of Music and was completed May 6, 1988.  It was given its world premiere at the Aspen Music Festival by the Cleveland Quartet in July 1988.  Rouse dedicated the composition to the people of the Soviet Union.

Composition

Structure
The work has a duration of roughly 17 minutes and is composed in three connected movements:
 Adagio
 Agitato
 Largo

Background
Rouse described the inspiration for the String Quartet No. 2 in the score program notes, writing:
The music is based upon the signature DSCH motif (D, E-flat, C, B) used by the Russian composer Dmitri Shostakovich, which appears in its original form and a number of variations. Rouse compared the "tragic" tone of the work to that of his Symphony No. 1, but nevertheless stipulated that the string quartet "is not programmatic in any specific sense and does not seek to convey any particular 'message.'"  He added, "This is the result of a personal desire to communicate ultimately with listeners of all nationalities and should not be interpreted as a socioplitical commentary in any way." Rouse later reworked the composition into his Concerto per Corde for string orchestra in 1990.

Reception
Reviewing the January 1989 New York City premiere, Charles McCardell of The Washington Post praised the string quartet, saying it "has a sort of Cold War grimness that spreads from a simple two-note motto initiated by the cello, then erupts in a full-blown ensemble clash, before finding a soothing B major resolution. Rouse's piece is impressive, and with any justice will be heard again soon and often."

References

Rouse 2
1988 compositions